The Faculty of Biology, Medicine and Health (BMH) is one of the three faculties that compose the University of Manchester. [1] Established in August 2016, the faculty was formed by the merger of the former Faculty of Medical and Health Sciences and the Faculty of Life Sciences. The Faculty comprises three schools: The School of Biological Sciences, The School of Health Science and The School of Medical Sciences.

Additionally, the Faculty also has nine subject areas which span the three schools: Biological sciences, Biomedical sciences, Dentistry, Medicine, Nursing, midwifery and social work, Optometry and ophthalmology, Pharmacy, Psychology, Speech and hearing.

The first dean of the Faculty was Professor Ian Greer who also acts as the Vice-President of the University of Manchester. Previously, he had been the Pro-Vice-Chancellor of the Faculty of Health and Life Sciences at the University of Liverpool 2010−2015.

The Faculty has a distinguished history. Its School of Medicine was the first medical school established in England outside London, the School of Nursing was the first British school to offer a degree in the subject, and similarly Manchester was the first university to award degrees in Pharmacy.

References

Biology education in the United Kingdom
Biology organisations based in the United Kingdom
Departments of the University of Manchester